Hello, Mabel (also known as On a Busy Wire) is a 1914 American short silent comedy film produced and directed by Mack Sennett and starring Mabel Normand. The supporting cast features Charley Chase, Al St. John, Minta Durfee, and Mack Swain.

Cast
 Mabel Normand as Mabel
 Phyllis Allen as Woman in hall
 Charley Chase as Mabel's boss
 Chester Conklin as Businessman
 Alice Davenport as His wife
 Minta Durfee
 Al St. John as Man in lobby
 Mack Swain as A married flirt

External links
 

1914 films
1914 comedy films
Silent American comedy films
American silent short films
Films directed by Mack Sennett
American black-and-white films
1914 short films
American comedy short films
1910s American films